is a Japanese weightlifter. He competed in the men's lightweight event at the 1976 Summer Olympics.

References

1953 births
Living people
Japanese male weightlifters
Olympic weightlifters of Japan
Weightlifters at the 1976 Summer Olympics
Place of birth missing (living people)
Asian Games medalists in weightlifting
Weightlifters at the 1982 Asian Games
Asian Games silver medalists for Japan
Medalists at the 1982 Asian Games
20th-century Japanese people
21st-century Japanese people